The Harrisburg Heat were an American professional indoor soccer team based in Harrisburg, Pennsylvania. The team was part of the National Professional Soccer League, which later became the Major Indoor Soccer League, and has been defunct since 2003.

History
The Harrisburg Heat were first formed during the 1991–92 season by Dr. Rex Herbert, following the folding of the Hershey Impact, another NPSL team for which Herbert was the team physician. Along with other investors, Herbert produced the fiscal and economic backdrop to support the team.

The Heat went through several seasons when they were among the most financially sound teams in the league. However, their only trip to the league finals was during the 1994–95 season, when the Heat took on the St. Louis Ambush, also now defunct. The Heat were swept in four games, losing 19–9, 18–8, 12–7 and 14–11.

The last few years of the team's existence saw declining attendance numbers, partly due to the State Farm Show Complex's construction project that restricted parking and also charged a fee for parking. Also, a portion of the team's ownership passed from Herbert to Rodney Rumberger, a Harrisburg-area businessman. Many of the team's popular players also had retired or signed with other teams. The team ceased operations following the 2002–03 season. Despite several attempts to put together a new ownership group, the Heat did not return the next season.

On May 2, 2012, it was announced that an expansion team named after the Harrisburg Heat will join the Professional Arena Soccer League in the fall, owned by the league. Longtime Heat broadcaster John Wilsbach took over as owner of the team from 2013 to 2016 and then sold it to Carl Delmont. The team is currently a member of the Major Arena Soccer League, a rebranding of the PASL.

The original Heat's home arena was in the Pennsylvania Farm Show Complex & Expo Center.

Year-by-year

Ownership
 Dr. Rex Herbert (1991–03)
 Rodney Rumberger (1995–03)
 Rob Bleecher

Staff
 Vice President – Jim Pollihan
 General Manager – Gregg Cook
 Public Relations Director – Gregory Bibb
 Equipment Manager – Mike Butala
 Director of Broadcasting – John Wilsbach

Head coaches
1991–99 Jim Pollihan
1999-02 Richard Chinapoo
2002–03 Erich Geyer

References

Defunct indoor soccer clubs in the United States
Major Indoor Soccer League (2001–2008) teams
National Professional Soccer League (1984–2001) teams
Sports in Harrisburg, Pennsylvania
Soccer clubs in Pennsylvania
Association football clubs established in 1991
1991 establishments in Pennsylvania
2003 disestablishments in Pennsylvania